Ashville is a hamlet near the junction of state routes 474 and 394, on the line between the towns of North Harmony and Busti in Chautauqua County, New York, United States.  It is the location of the Smith Bly House, listed on the National Register of Historic Places in 1974. The hamlet is located at an elevation of 1358 ft (414 m) above sea level.

References

Hamlets in New York (state)
Hamlets in Chautauqua County, New York